Captain Esmé Chinnery (28 March 1886 – 18 January 1915) was an English soldier and aviator. He played one first-class cricket match for Surrey in 1906. He was killed in an aircraft accident during World War I.

Education and private life
After school, Chinnery went up to Brasenose College in the University of Oxford. Whilst at Oxford he became a Freemason in the Apollo University Lodge, a Masonic lodge for students and former students of the university. He played cricket at university, and whilst still an undergraduate he was selected to play in the first team for Surrey County Cricket Club.

Military career
Chinnery was commissioned as a Coldstream Guards officer in 1910 and was seconded to the Royal Flying Corps in 1913. He obtained his aviators certificate at Brooklands Aerodrome on 30 April 1912, flying a Deperdussin Monoplane.

Death
Chinnery was flying as a passenger in a Voisin biplane when the aircraft broke up and both he and the pilot fell to earth, Chinnery died and the French aviator Laporte died later in hospital. Following his death a memorial service was held at the Embassy Church in Paris and his body was repatriated to England for a military funeral, and burial in his family's plot at St. Matthew Church at Hatchford in Surrey.

See also
 List of Surrey County Cricket Club players
 List of cricketers who were killed during military service

References

External links
 

1886 births
1915 deaths
Aviators killed in aviation accidents or incidents in France
British Army personnel of World War I
British military personnel killed in World War I
Coldstream Guards officers
Cricketers from Cobham, Surrey
English aviators
English cricketers
Royal Flying Corps officers
Surrey cricketers